Ulyqbek Asanbayev (Ūlyqbek Asanbaev) is retired Kazakh footballer of Uzbek descent.

Career statistics

Club
Last update: 2012

International

Statistics accurate as of match played 10 September 2008

Honours
MHSK Tashkent
Uzbek League (1): 1997
Dustlik
Uzbek League (1): 1999
Pakhtakor Tashkent
Uzbekistan Cup (1): 2001
Zhenis Astana
Kazakhstan Premier League (1): 2001
Kazakhstan Cup (1): 2000-01
Kairat
Kazakhstan Premier League (1): 2004
Kazakhstan Cup (1): 2003
Aktobe
Kazakhstan Premier League (3): 2007, 2008, 2009
Kazakhstan Cup (1): 2008
Ordabasy
Kazakhstan Cup (1): 2011

References

External links

Profile at National Team Website

1979 births
Living people
People from Shymkent
Kazakhstani footballers
Kazakhstan international footballers
Kazakhstan Premier League players
FC Zhenis Astana players
FC Kairat players
Pakhtakor Tashkent FK players
FC Aktobe players
FC Kyzylzhar players
FC Ordabasy players
FC Irtysh Pavlodar players
FC Okzhetpes players
Uzbekistani expatriate sportspeople in Kazakhstan
Association football midfielders